This is a list of current secret police organizations. Fictional secret police organizations and historical secret police organizations are listed on their own respective pages.

In this list, reputable sources, with relevant quotes, assert that the organizations in this list are secret police.

Agencies by country

See also 
 Intelligence agency
 Mass surveillance
 Mukhabarat
 PRISM
 Secret service
 Surveillance

Lists:
 List of fictional secret police organizations
 List of historical secret police organizations
 List of intelligence agencies
 List of law enforcement agencies
 List of protective service agencies

Citations

Law enforcement-related lists